The 2002 Montreal Expos season was the 34th season in franchise history.

Offseason
 October 3, 2001: The Expos sent Tim Raines to the Baltimore Orioles as part of a conditional deal.
 February 21, 2002: The Expos signed José Canseco as a free agent.
 March 7, 2002: The Expos signed Alan Mills as a free agent.
 March 24, 2002: The Expos traded Jason Bay and Jimmy Serrano to the New York Mets for Lou Collier.
 March 27, 2002: The Expos released José Canseco.
 March 28, 2002: The Expos signed Henry Rodriguez as a free agent.

Spring training
In 2002, the Expos held spring training at Roger Dean Stadium in Jupiter, Florida – a facility they shared with the St. Louis Cardinals – for the fifth and final season. The following year, they moved to Space Coast Stadium in Viera, Florida, for spring training.

Regular season

Opening Day lineup 
Source

Season standings

National League East

Record vs. opponents

Notable transactions
May 16, 2002: The Expos released Henry Rodriguez.
 June 27, 2002: The Expos traded Grady Sizemore, Cliff Lee, Brandon Phillips, and Lee Stevens to the Cleveland Indians for Bartolo Colón and Tim Drew.
 July 11, 2002: The Expos traded Graeme Lloyd, Mike Mordecai, Carl Pavano, Justin Wayne, and a player to be named later to the Florida Marlins for Cliff Floyd, Wilton Guerrero, Claudio Vargas, and cash. The Expos sent Donald Levinski (minors) to the Marlins on August 5, 2002, to complete the trade.
 July 19, 2002: The Expos released Sean Spencer.
 July 30, 2002: The Expos traded Cliff Floyd to the Boston Red Sox for Sun-Woo Kim and Seung Song (minors).

Roster

Game log
Source 

|- align="center" bgcolor="bbffbb"
| 1 || April 2 || Marlins || 7–6 || Herges (1–0) || Looper (0–1) || || 34,351 || 1–0
|- align="center" bgcolor="ffbbbb"
| 2 || April 3 || Marlins || 5–6 || Burnett (1–0) || Armas (0–1) || Tejera (1) || 4,771 || 1–1
|- align="center" bgcolor="ffbbbb"
| 3 || April 4 || Marlins || 0–1 || Penny (1–0) || Pavano (0–1) || ||  4,551 || 1–2
|- align="center" bgcolor="bbffbb"
| 4 || April 5 || @ Reds || 8–7 || Yoshii (1–0) || Haynes (0–1) || Lloyd (1) ||  17,123 || 2–2
|- align="center" bgcolor="bbffbb"
| 5 ||  April 6 || @ Reds || 5–2  || Ohka (1–0) || Pineda (0–1) || Lloyd (2) || 18,176 || 3–2
|- align="center" bgcolor="ffbbbb"
| 6 ||  April 7 || @ Reds || 5–6 (10) || Sullivan (1–0) || Lloyd (0–1) || || 17,549 || 3–3
|- align="center" bgcolor="bbffbb"
| 7 ||  April 8 || @ Marlins || 10–2 || Armas (1–1) || Burnett (1–1) || || 23,877 || 4–3
|- align="center" bgcolor="bbffbb"
| 8 ||  April 10 || @ Marlins || 5–3 || Pavano (1–1) || Penny (1–1) || || 5,422 || 5–3 
|- align="center" bgcolor="ffbbbb"
| 9 ||  April 11 || @ Marlins || 5–7  || Tavárez (1–1) || Yoshii (1–1)  || Núñez (1) || 4,466 || 5–4
|- align="center" bgcolor="ffbbbb"
| 10 || April 12 || @ Mets || 1–2 || D'Amico (1–0)  || Ohka (1–2) || Benítez (3) || 32,624 || 5–5
|- align="center" bgcolor="bbffbb"
| 11 || April 13 || @ Mets || 9–8 (11) || Herges (2–0) || Strickland (0–1) || || 46,991 || 6–5
|- align="center" bgcolor="ffbbbb"
| 12 || April 14 ||@ Mets || 4–6 || Trachsel (1–2)  || Armas (1–2) || Benítez (4) || 45,646 || 6–6
|- align="center" bgcolor="ffbbbb"
| 13 || April 15 || Cubs || 4–6 || Wood (2–0) || Pavano (1–2) || Alfonseca (2) || 4,917 || 6–7
|- align="center" bgcolor="bbffbb"
| 14 || April 16 || Cubs || 8–4 || Yoshii (2–1) || Cruz (0–3) || Tucker (1) || 4,486 || 7–7
|- align="center" bgcolor="bbffbb"
| 15 || April 17 || Cubs || 15–8 || Chen (1–0) || Osborne (0–1) || || 4,300 || 8–7
|- align="center" bgcolor="ffbbbb"
| 16 || April 18 || Mets || 0–1 || Leiter (2–0) || Vázquez (0–1) || || 4,512 || 8–8
|- align="center" bgcolor="bbffbb"
| 17 || April 19 || Mets || 5–3 || Armas (2–2) || Trachsel (1–3) || Herges (1) || 8,281 || 9–8
|- align="center" bgcolor="bbffbb"
| 18 || April 20 || Mets || 7–5 || Pavano (2–2) || Estes (0–2) || Herges (2) || 11,464 || 10–8
|- align="center" bgcolor="bbffbb"
| 19 || April 21 || Mets || 6–3 || Chen (2–0) || Astacio (3–1) || Lloyd (3) ||  11,672 || 11–8
|- align="center" bgcolor="bbffbb"
| 20 || April 23 || Brewers || 5–4 || Ohka (2–1) || Sheets (1–3) ||Herges (3) || 3,561 || 12–8
|- align="center" bgcolor="bbffbb"
| 21 || April 24 || Brewers || 5–4 (15) || Tucker (1–0)  || Cabrera (1–3) || || 5,295 || 13–8 
|- align="center" bgcolor="bbffbb"
| 22 || April 25 || Brewers || 5–1 || Armas (3–2) || Quevedo (1–2) || Lloyd (4) || 3,501|| 14–8
|- align="center" bgcolor="ffbbbb"
| 23 || April 26 || Cardinals || 6–7 (11) || Stechschulte (2–0) || Ohka (2–2) || Veres (1) || 8,545 || 14–9
|- align="center" bgcolor="ffbbbb"
| 24 || April 27 || Cardinals || 0–5 || Matthews (1–0) || Chen (2–1) || || 6,288 || 14–10
|- align="center" bgcolor="bbffbb"
| 25 || April 28 || Cardinals || 5–2 || Ohka (3–2)  || Morris (4–2) || Herges (4) || 9,780 || 15–10
|- align="center" bgcolor="bbffbb"
| 26 || April 30 || @ Astros || 5–1  || Vázquez (1–1) || Oswalt (3–1) || || 28,178 || 16–10
|-

|- align="center" bgcolor="bbffbb"
| 27 || May 1 || @ Astros || 5–4 || Armas (4–2) || Dotel (0–1) || Herges (5) || 25,535 || 17–10
|- align="center" bgcolor="ffbbbb"
| 28 || May 2 || @ Astros || 2–8 || Redding (1–2) || Pavano (2–3) || || 25,788 || 17–11
|- align="center" bgcolor="ffbbbb"
| 29 || May 3 || @ Diamondbacks || 3–6 || Schilling (6–1) || Chen (2–4) || Kim (7) || 31,315 || 17–12
|- align="center" bgcolor="ffbbbb"
| 30 || May 4 || @ Diamondbacks || 5–6 (11) || Oropesa (1–0) || Lloyd (0–2) || || 40,427 || 17–13
|- align="center" bgcolor="ffbbbb"
| 31 || May 5 || @ Diamondbacks || 2–5 || Morgan (1–0) || Vázquez (1–2) || Kim (8) || 37,027 || 17–14
|- align="center" bgcolor="ffbbbb"
| 32 || May 7 || Rockies || 3–5 || Thomson (5–2) || Armas (4–3) || Jiménez (8) || 3,780 || 17–15
|- align="center" bgcolor="ffbbbb"
| 33 || May 8 || Rockies || 0–5 || Chacón (3–4) || Pavano (2–4) || || 5,220 || 17–16
|- align="center" bgcolor="bbffbb"
| 34 || May 9 || Rockies || 6–5 (12) || Lloyd (1–2) || White (0–4) || || 3,183 || 18–16
|- align="center" bgcolor="bbffbb"
| 35 || May 10 || Giants || 6–3 || Vázquez (2–2) || Hernández (4–3) || || 7,238 || 19–16
|- align="center" bgcolor="ffbbbb" 
| 36 || May 11 || Giants || 2–3 || Fultz (2–1) || Reames (0–1) || Nen (11) || 29,778 || 19–17
|- align="center" bgcolor="bbffbb"
| 37 || May 12 || Giants || 4–2 || Armas (5–3) || Ortiz (3–2) || Herges (6) || 5,528 || 20–17
|- align="center" bgcolor="ffbbbb" 
| 38 || May 13 || @ Padres || 3–7 || Tomko (3–2) || Pavano (2–5) || || 27,865 || 20–18
|- align="center" bgcolor="ffbbbb"
| 39 || May 14 || @ Padres || 4–5 || Hoffman (1–0) || Stewart (0–1) || || 12,402 || 20–19
|- align="center" bgcolor="ffbbbb"
| 40 || May 15 || @ Padres || 1–2 (14) || Embree (3–1) || Eischen (0–1) || || 38,963 || 20–20
|- align="center" bgcolor="ffbbbb"
| 41 || May 16 || @ Dodgers || 3–4 || Daal (4–0) || Ohka (3–3) || Gagné (13) || 21,408 || 20–21
|- align="center" bgcolor="ffbbbb"
| 42 || May 17 || @ Dodgers || 5–8 || Nomo (3–5) || Armas (5–4) || Gagné (14) || 48,146 || 20–22
|- align="center" bgcolor="bbffbb"
| 43 || May 18 || @ Dodgers || 3–1 ||  Pavano (3–5) || Pérez (4–2) || Tucker (2) || 42,881 || 21–22
|- align="center" bgcolor="ffbbbb"
| 44 || May 19 ||  @ Dodgers || 1–10 || Ashby (3–4) || Chen (2–3) || || 31,816 || 21–23
|- align="center" bgcolor="bbffbb"
| 45 || May 21 || Braves || 5–4 (10) || Tucker (2–0) || Holmes (2–1) || || 5,442 || 22–23
|- align="center" bgcolor="ffbbbb"
| 46 || May 22 || Braves || 0–2 || Glavine (7–2) || Armas (5–5) || || 5,504 || 22–24
|- align="center" bgcolor="bbffbb"
| 47 || May 24 || Phillies || 4–1 || Ohka (4–3) || Wolf (3–3) || Stewart (1) || 6,091 || 23–24
|- align="center" bgcolor="bbffbb"
| 48 || May 25 || Phillies || 13–9 (10) || Tucker (3–0) || Mercado (1–1) || || 8,370 || 24–24
|- align="center" bgcolor="bbffbb"
| 49 || May 26 || Phillies || 6–5 || Lloyd (2–2) || Padilla (6–4) || Stewart (2) || 19,015 || 25–24
|- align="center" bgcolor="ffbbbb"
| 50 || May 27 || @ Braves || 1–5 || Glavine (8–2) || Armas (5–6) || || 30,187 || 25–25
|- align="center" bgcolor="ffbbbb"
| 51 || May 28 || @ Braves || 2–5 || Moss (2–1) || Yoshii (2–2) || Smoltz (14) || 22,278 || 25–26
|- align="center" bgcolor="bbffbb"
| 52 || May 29 || @ Braves || 4–3 || Tucker (4–0) || Smoltz (0–2) || Stewart (3) || 20,162 || 26–26 
|- align="center" bgcolor="ffbbbb"
| 53 || May 30 || @ Braves || 2–5 || Marquis (4–3) || Pavanp (3–6) || || 24,025 || 26–27
|- align="center" bgcolor="bbffbb"
| 54 || May 31 || @ Phillies || 8–7 || Vázquez (3–2) || Duckworth (2–4) || Stewart (4) || 15,455 || 27–27
|-

|- align="center" bgcolor="ffbbbb"
| 55 || June 1 || @ Phillies || 4–8 || Padilla (7–4) || Armas (5–7) || || 16,601 || 27–28
|- align="center" bgcolor="ffbbbb"
| 56 || June 2 || @ Phillies || 3–18 || Person (1–3) || Reames  (0–2) || || 19,223 || 27–29
|- align="center" bgcolor="bbffbb"
| 57 || June 3 || Pirates || 7–5  || Ohka (5–3) || Wells (8–3) || Stewart (4) ||  4,821 || 28–29
|- align="center" bgcolor="ffbbbb"
| 58 || June 4 || Pirates || 2–5 || Anderson (5–7) || Pavano (3–7) || || 4,619 || 28–30
|- align="center" bgcolor="bbffbb"
| 59 || June 5 || Pirates  || 3–1 || Vázquez (4–2) || Fogg (6–4) || || 4,890 || 29–30
|- align="center" bgcolor="bbffbb"
| 60 || June 7 || @ White Sox || 4–3 || Armas (6–7) || Wright (5–7) || Tucker (3) || 22,481 || 30–30
|- align="center" bgcolor="bbffbb"
| 61 || June 8 || @ White Sox || 2–1 || Stewart (1–1) || Foulke (0–4) || Tucker (4) || 24,783 || 31–30
|- align="center" bgcolor="ffbbbb"
| 62 || June 9 || @ White Sox || 2–13 || Buehrle (9–4) || Pavano (3–8) || || 21,870 || 31–31
|- align="center" bgcolor="ffbbbb"
| 63 || June 10 || @ Tigers || 4–6 || Bernero (2–2) || Vázquez (4–3) || Acevedo (8) || 11,642 || 31–32
|- align="center" bgcolor="ffbbbb"
| 64 || June 11 || @ Tigers || 1–2 || Redman (3–6) || Herges (2–1) || Acevedo (9) || 14,100 || 31–33
|- align="center" bgcolor="bbffbb"
| 65 || June 12 || @ Tigers || 2–1 (10) || Stewart (2–1) || Acevedo (1–2) || Lloyd (5) || 16,837 || 32–33
|- align="center" bgcolor="bbffbb"
| 66 || June 14 || Blue Jays || 8–2 || Ohka (6–3) || Miller (4–3) || || 7,557 || 33–33
|- align="center" bgcolor="bbffbb"
| 67 || June 15 || Blue Jays || 9–3 || Day (1–0) || Loaiza (3–3) || || 12,474 || 34–33
|- align="center" bgcolor="bbffbb"
| 68 || June 16 || Blue Jays || 6–5 || Stewart (3–1) || Escobar (3–3) || || 15,425 || 35–33
|- align="center" bgcolor="bbffbb"
| 69 || June 18 || Royals || 5–4 || Day (2–0)  || Mullen (0–1) || Stewart (6) || 6,249 || 36–33
|- align="center" bgcolor="bbffbb"
| 70 || June 19 || Royals || 6–3 || Ohka (7–3) || Suzuki (0–2) || Stewart (7) || 6,187 || 37–33
|- align="center" bgcolor="bbffbb"
| 71 || June 20 || Royals || 5–4 (11) || Eischen (1–1) || Mullen (0–2) || || 5,773 || 38–33
|- align="center" bgcolor="bbffbb"
| 72 || June 21 || Indians || 3–1 || Vázquez (5–3) || Sabathia (5–6) || Stewart (8) || 7,494 || 39–33
|- align="center" bgcolor="ffbbbb"
| 73 || June 22 || Indians || 4–5 || Colón (10–4) || Day (2–1) || Wickman (17) || 10,180 || 39–34
|- align="center" bgcolor="bbffbb"
| 74 || June 23 || Indians || 7–2 || Armas (7–7) || Finley (4–9) || || 13,557 || 40–34
|- align="center" bgcolor="ffbbbb"
| 75 || June 25 || @ Pirates || 1–4 || Benson (1–4) || Ohka (7–4) || Williams (20) || 17,543 || 40–35
|- align="center" bgcolor="ffbbbb"
| 76 || June 26 || @ Pirates || 4–7 || Wells (9–4) || Vázquez (5–4) || Williams (21) || 36,966 || 40–36
|- align="center" bgcolor="bbffbb"
| 77 || June 27 || @ Pirates || 7–2 (7) || Brower (3–0) || Villone (2–6) || || 21,312 || 41–36
|- align="center" bgcolor="bbffbb"
| 78 || June 28 || @ Blue Jays || 2–1  || Armas (8–7) || Halladay (9–4) || Williams (20) || 20,848 || 42–36
|- align="center" bgcolor="ffbbbb"
| 79 || June 29 || @ Blue Jays || 4–5 (10) || Escobar (4–4) || Herges (2–2) || || 24,344|| 42–37
|- align="center" bgcolor="ffbbbb"
| 80 || June 30 || @ Blue Jays || 5–7 || Eyre (2–3) || Lloyd (2–3) || Escobar (14) || 24,965 || 42–38
|-

|- align="center" bgcolor="ffbbbb"
| 81 || July 1 || @ Braves || 5–7 || Ligtenberg (2–3) || Vázquez (5–5) || Smoltz (28) || 26,053 || 42–39
|- align="center" bgcolor="bbffbb"
| 82 || July 2 || @ Braves || 5–2 || Colón (11–4) || Moss  (4–3) || Stewart (10) || 25,581 || 43–39
|- align="center" bgcolor="ffbbbb"
| 83 || July 3 || @ Braves || 5–6 || Smoltz (1–2) || Brower (3–1) || || 23,439 || 43–40
|- align="center" bgcolor="bbffbb"
| 84 || July 4 || @ Phillies || 2–1 || Eischen (2–1) || Mesa (2–5) || Stewart (11) || 12,303 || 44–40
|- align="center" bgcolor="bbffbb"
| 85 || July 5 || @ Phillies || 8–3 || Ohka (8–4) || Person (3–5) || || 44,143 || 45–40
|- align="center" bgcolor="bbffbb"
| 86 || July 6 || @ Phillies || 5–3 || Vázquez (6–5) || Duckworth (5–6) || Stewart (12) || 15,228 || 46–40
|- align="center" bgcolor="ffbbbb"
| 87 || July 7 ||  @ Phillies || 8–10 || Cormier (4–4) || Herges (2–3) || Mesa (23) || 17,393 || 46–41
|- style="text-align:center; background:#bbb;"
|colspan=9| All–Star Break (July 8–10)
|- align="center" bgcolor="ffbbbb"
| 88 || July 11 || Braves || 5–8 || Millwood (7–5) || Armas (8–8) || Smoltz (32) || 11,855 || 46–42
|- align="center" bgcolor="ffbbbb"
| 89 || July 12 || Braves || 3–8 || Remlinger (7–0) || Tucker (4–1) || || 14,256 || 46–43
|- align="center" bgcolor="bbffbb"
| 90 || July 13 || Braves || 6–3 || Colón (12–4) || Glavine (11–5) || || 17,335 || 47–43
|- align="center" bgcolor="bbffbb"
| 91 || July 14 || Braves || 10–3 || Vázquez (7–5) || Moss (4–4) || || 25,109 || 48–43
|- align="center" bgcolor="ffbbbb"
| 92 || July 15 || Phillies || 8–11 || Coggin (1–2) || Herges (2–4) || Mesa (24) || 11,576 || 48–44
|- align="center" bgcolor="ffbbbb"
| 93 || July 16 || Phillies || 3–6 || Wolf (5–6) || Armas (8–9) || Mesa (25) || 10,325 || 48–45
|- align="center" bgcolor="ffbbbb"
| 94 || July 17 || Mets || 6–9 || Guthrie (4–0) || Stewart (3–2) || || 13,402 || 48–46
|- align="center" bgcolor="bbffbb"
| 95 || July 18 || Mets || 2–1 || Colón (13–4) || Corey (0–2) || || 13,797 || 49–46
|- align="center" bgcolor="ffbbbb"
| 96 || July 19 || @ Marlins || 2–4 || Tejera (6–2) || Vázquez (7–6) || Núñez (19) || 6,941 || 49–47
|- align="center" bgcolor="ffbbbb"
| 97 || July 20 || @ Marlins || 0–3 || Penny (4–4) || Yoshii (2–3) || Looper (1) || 8,883 || 49–48
|- align="center" bgcolor="ffbbbb"
| 98 || July 21 || @ Marlins || 0–4 || Beckett (3–4) || Armas (8–10) || Núñez (20) || 8,320 || 49–49
|- align="center" bgcolor="ffbbbb"
| 99 || July 22 || @ Mets || 2–5 || Weathers (4–3) || Ohka (8–5) || Benítez (24) || 23,655 || 49–50
|- align="center" bgcolor="ffbbbb"
| 100 || July 23 || @ Mets || 3–4 || D'Amico (5–8) || Colón (13–5) || Benítez (25) || 36,289 || 49–51
|- align="center" bgcolor="bbffbb"
| 101 || July 24 || @ Mets || 2–1 || Vázquez (8–6) || Estes (3–8) || Stewart (13) || 28,526 || 50–51
|- align="center" bgcolor="ffbbbb"
| 102 || July 25 || Marlins || 2–3 || Núñez (5–3) || Tucker (4–2) || || 8,557 || 50–52
|- align="center" bgcolor="bbffbb"
| 103 || July 26 || Marlins || 6–5 (10) || Tucker (5–2) || Núñez (5–4) || || 9,406 || 51–52
|- align="center" bgcolor="ffbbbb"
| 104 || July 27 || Marlins || 2–7 || Burnett (10–7) || Ohka (8–6) || || 19,373 || 51–53
|- align="center" bgcolor="bbffbb"
| 105 || July 28 || Marlins || 4–1 || Colón (14–5) || Tavárez (7–8) || || 16,770 || 52–53
|- align="center" bgcolor="bbffbb"
| 106 || July 30 || Diamondbacks || 5–4 (10) || Tucker (6–2) ||  Kim (4–2) || || 11,068 || 53–53
|- align="center" bgcolor="ffbbbb"
| 107 || July 31 || Diamondbacks || 1–5 || Johnson (15–4) ||  Yoshii (2–4) || || 11,747 || 53–54
|-

|- align="center" bgcolor="bbffbb"
| 108 || August 1 || Diamondbacks || 2–1 || Eischen (3–1) || Schilling (18–4) || || 10,873 || 54–54
|- align="center" bgcolor="bbffbb"
| 109 || August 2 || Astros || 3–1 || Reames (1–2) || Munro (2–1) || Stewart (14) || 7,691 || 55–54
|- align="center" bgcolor="ffbbbb"
| 110 || August 3 || Astros || 3–5 || Miller (9–3) || Tucker (6–3) || Wagner (22) || 12,157 || 55–55
|- align="center" bgcolor="ffbbbb"
| 111 || August 4 || Astros || 4–5 || Saarloos (4–2) || Vázquez (8–7) || Wagner (23) || 20,027 || 55–56
|- align="center" bgcolor="bbffbb"
| 112 || August 6 || @ Cardinals || 10–1 || Yoshii (3–4) || Finley (6–13) || ||  34,126 || 56–56
|- align="center" bgcolor="bbffbb"
| 113 || August 7 || @ Cardinals || 4–1 || Ohka (9–6) || Simontacchi (7–4) || Stewart (15) || 33,179 || 57–56
|- align="center" bgcolor="ffbbbb"
| 114 || August 8 || @ Cardinals || 3–5 || Morris (13–7) || Reames (1–3) || Isringhausen (25)|| 33,403 || 57–57
|- align="center" bgcolor="bbffbb"
| 115 || August 9 || @ Brewers || 11–4 || Colón (15–5) || Quevedo (6–10) || || 25,919 || 58–57
|- align="center" bgcolor="ffbbbb"
| 116 || August 10 || @ Brewers || 2–5 || Cabrera (5–8) || Vázquez (8–8) || DeJean (19) || 24,954 || 58–58
|- align="center" bgcolor="ffbbbb"
| 117 || August 11 || @ Brewers || 2–6 || Sheets (6–14) || Yoshii (3–5) || || 30,153 || 58–59
|- align="center" bgcolor="bbffbb"
| 118 || August 13 || Dodgers || 4–3 || Smith (4–2) || Gagné (1–1) || Stewart (16) || 13,263 || 59–59
|- align="center" bgcolor="ffbbbb"
| 119 || August 14 || Dodgers || 2–5 || Ishii (13–7) || Colón (15–6) || Gagné (40) || 13,416 || 59–60
|- align="center" bgcolor="ffbbbb"
| 120 || August 15 || Dodgers  || 0–1 || Daal (10–6) ||  Vázquez (8–9) || Gagné (41) || 10,985 || 59–61
|- align="center" bgcolor="bbffbb"
| 121 || August 16 || Padres || 11–6 || Day (3–1) || Kershner (0–1) || || 7,564 || 60–61
|- align="center" bgcolor="ffbbbb"
| 122 || August 17 || Padres || 5–6 || Johnson (1–0) || Herges (2–5) || Hoffman (32) || 9,121 || 60–62
|- align="center" bgcolor="bbffbb"
| 123 || August 18 || Padres || 9–2 || Ohka (10–6) || Peavy (4–5) || || 24,872 || 61–62
|- align="center" bgcolor="bbffbb"
| 124 || August 19 || Padres || 4–0 ||  Colón (16–6) || Lawrence (11–7) || || 8,266 || 62–62
|- align="center" bgcolor="ffbbbb"
| 125 || August 20 || @ Rockies || 6–8 || Neagle (7–7) || Vázquez (8–10) || Jiménez (34) || 28,278 || 62–63
|- align="center" bgcolor="bbffbb"
| 126 || August 21 || @ Rockies || 13–5 || Yoshii (4–5) || Chacón (5–11) || || 27,916 || 63–63
|- align="center" bgcolor="ffbbbb"
| 127 || August 22 || @ Rockies || 6–14 || Stark (9–3) || Armas (8–11) || || 27,231 || 63–64
|- align="center" bgcolor="bbffbb"
| 128 || August 23 || @ Giants || 7–2 || Ohka (11–6) || Ortiz (8–10) || Eischen (1)|| 40,879 || 64–64
|- align="center" bgcolor="bbffbb"
| 129 || August 24 || @ Giants || 7–2 || Colón (17–6) || Hernández (8–14) || Stewart (17) || 41,165 || 65–64
|- align="center" bgcolor="ffbbbb"
| 130 || August 25 || @ Giants || 4–8 || Schmidt (9–6) || Vázquez (8–11) || || 41,408 || 65–65
|- align="center" bgcolor="ffbbbb"
| 131 || August 27 || @ Phillies || 2–4 || Roa (3–1) || Yoshii (4–6) || Mesa (37) || 16,126 || 65–66
|- align="center" bgcolor="bbffbb"
| 132 || August 28 || @ Phillies || 6–3 || Ohka (12–6) || Coggin (2–5) || || 13,821 || 66–66
|- align="center" bgcolor="ffbbbb"
| 133 || August 29 || @ Phillies || 1–2 || Duckworth (6–8) || Colón (17–7) || Mesa (38) || 14,268 || 66–67
|- align="center" bgcolor="ffbbbb"
| 134 || August 30 || Braves || 2–4 || Moss (9–5) || Armas (8–12) || Smoltz (47) || 7,659 || 66–68
|- align="center" bgcolor="ffbbbb"
| 135 || August 31 || Braves || 3–5 || Hammond (7–2) || Vázquez (8–12) || Smoltz (48) || 8,528 || 66–69
|-

|- align="center" bgcolor="ffbbbb"
| 136 || September 1 || Braves || 4–6 || Millwood (15–6) || Yoshii (4–7) || Smoltz (49) || 10,581 || 66–70
|- align="center" bgcolor="bbffbb"
| 137 || September 2 || Phillies || 5–1 || Ohka (13–6) || Roa (3–2) || || 5,723 || 67–70
|- align="center" bgcolor="bbffbb"
| 138 || September 3 || Phillies || 7–6 (10) || Eischen (4–1) || Adams (5–9) || || 3,879 || 68–70
|- align="center" bgcolor="bbffbb"
| 139 || September 4 || Phillies || 8–5 || Armas (9–12) || Padilla (14–9) || Eischen (2) || 4,379 || 69–70
|- align="center" bgcolor="ffbbbb"
| 140 || September 5 || Phillies || 1–4 || Wolf (11–7) || Vázquez (8–13) || || 2,134 || 69–71
|- align="center" bgcolor="ffbbbb"
| 141 || September 6 || @ Braves || 0–5 || Millwood (16–6) || Yoshii (4–8) || || 24,361 || 69–72
|- align="center" bgcolor="ffbbbb"
| 142 || September 7 || @ Braves || 0–4 || Maddux (13–5) ||  Ohka (13–7) || || 34,424 || 69–73
|- align="center" bgcolor="bbffbb"
| 143 || September 8 || @ Braves || 7–0 || Colón (18–7) || Glavine (16–10) || || 25,551 || 70–73
|- align="center" bgcolor="ffbbbb"
| 144 || September 9 || @ Cubs || 2–3 || Borowski (4–4) || Brower (3–2) || || 28,162 || 70–74
|- align="center" bgcolor="bbffbb"
| 145 || September 10 || @ Cubs || 6–2 ||  Vázquez (9–13) || Zambrano (3–7) || || 29,587 || 71–74
|- align="center" bgcolor="ffbbbb"
| 146 || September 11 || @ Cubs || 3–6 || Benes (2–1) || Yoshii (4–9) || Alfonseca (18) || 20,503 || 71–75
|- align="center" bgcolor="ffbbbb"
| 147 || September 12 || Mets || 2–8 || Middlebrook (2–3) || Ohka (13–8) || || 4,147 || 71–76
|- align="center" bgcolor="bbffbb"
| 148 || September 13 || Mets || 11–8 || Colón (19–7) || Thomson (9–12) || Smith (1) || 7,219 || 72–76
|- align="center" bgcolor="bbffbb"
| 149 || September 14 || Mets || 5–4 || Armas (10–12) || Bacsik (3–2) || Smith (2) || 17,278 || 73–76
|- align="center" bgcolor="bbffbb"
| 150 || September 15 || Mets || 10–1 || Vázquez (10–13) || Astacio (12–10) || || 16,608 || 74–76
|- align="center" bgcolor="bbffbb"
| 151 || September 17 || @ Marlins || 8–5 (14) || Stewart (4–2) || Lloyd (4–5) || || 4,836 || 75–76
|- align="center" bgcolor="bbffbb"
| 152 || September 18 || @ Marlins || 4–2 (11) || Eischen (5–1) || Mairena (2–3) || Drew (1) || 5,105 || 76–76
|- align="center" bgcolor="bbffbb"
| 153 || September 19 || @ Marlins || 6–5 || Colón (20–7) || Knotts (2–1) || Drew (2) || 5,148 || 77–76
|- align="center" bgcolor="bbffbb"
| 154 || September 20 || @ Mets || 6–1 || Armas (11–12) || Thomson (9–13) || || 23,675 || 78–76
|- align="center" bgcolor="ffbbbb"
| 155 || September 21 || @ Mets || 3–6 (11) || Benítez (1–0) || Smith (1–1) || || 30,946 || 78–77
|- align="center" bgcolor="bbffbb"
| 156 || September 22 || @ Mets || 5–1 || Day (4–1) || Leiter (13–12) || || 36,730 || 79–77
|- align="center" bgcolor="ffbbbb"
| 157 || September 24 || Marlins || 6–9 || Pavano (6–10) || Reames (1–4) || Looper (12) || 5,352 || 79–78
|- align="center" bgcolor="ffbbbb"
| 158 || September 25 || Marlins || 2–10 || Beckett (6–7) || Colón (20–8) || || 7,416 || 79–79
|- align="center" bgcolor="bbffbb"
| 159 || September 26 || Marlins || 4–3 || Armas (12–12) || Penny (8–7) || Day (1) || 5,869 || 80–79
|- align="center" bgcolor="bbffbb"
| 160 || September 27 || Reds || 4–3 (11) || Eischen (6–1) || Riedling (2–4) || || 7,750 || 81–79
|- align="center" bgcolor="bbffbb"
| 161 || September 28 || Reds || 6–0 || Kim (3–0) || Moehler (3–5) || || 11,376 || 82–79
|- align="center" bgcolor="bbffbb"
| 162 || September 29 || Reds || 7–2 || Drew (1–0) || Haynes (15–10) || || 25,178 || 83–79
|-

Attendance

The Expos drew 812,045 fans during the 2002 season, and were 16th in attendance among the 16 National League teams. Their highest attendance for the season was for the Opening Day game on April 2 against the Florida Marlins, which drew 34,351 fans, while their lowest was for a game on September 5 against the Philadelphia Phillies, which drew only 2,134 fans.

Player stats

Batting

Note: Pos = Position; G = Games played; AB = At bats; R = Runs scored; H = Hits; 2B = Doubles; 3B = Triples; HR = Home runs; RBI = Runs batted in; AVG = Batting average; SB = Stolen bases

Complete offensive statistics are available here.

Pitching
Note: Pos = Position; W = Wins; L = Losses; ERA = Earned run average; G = Games pitched; GS = Games started; SV = Saves; IP = Innings pitched; R = Runs allowed; ER = Earned runs allowed; BB = Walks allowed; K = Strikeouts

Complete pitching statistics are available here.

Award winners

2002 Major League Baseball All-Star Game

Farm system

References

 2002 Montreal Expos at Baseball Reference
 2002 Montreal Expos at Baseball Almanac

Montreal Expos season
Montreal Expos seasons
2000s in Montreal
2002 in Quebec